CCGS Vincent Massey is an icebreaking anchor handling tug supply vessel (AHTS) converted to a medium class icebreaker for the Canadian Coast Guard. She was originally built as Tor Viking for Trans Viking Icebreaking & Offshore AS in 2000 and has also traded under the name Tor Viking II. The vessel was sold to Canada in 2018 and was initially expected to enter service in summer 2020 following a refit. However, the conversion work was delayed and the vessel was delivered to the Canadian Coast Guard in October 2022.

Design 

Originally built to DNV ice class "ICE-10 Icebreaker", her hull structures and propulsion system will be upgraded to Polar Class 4 level and the vessel will be rated as Arctic Class 2 in Canadian service. Originally she was served by a crew of 23, but this will be reduced to 19 (9 officers and 10 crew) when the vessel is commissioned by the Canadian Coast Guard.

Vincent Massey has four medium-speed diesel engines geared to two controllable pitch propellers in nozzles. In addition, she has two bow thrusters (one fixed, one retractable and azimuthing) and one transverse stern thruster for maneuvering and dynamic positioning.

Career

Tor Viking and Tor Viking II (2000–2018) 

She has been employed supplying offshore Arctic petroleum drilling expedition.

From 2003 to 2017, the vessel was named Tor Viking II because the Swedish ship registry does not allow two ships sharing a name.

In late January 2010 the Swedish Maritime Administration called for Vidar Viking and Tor Viking to serve as icebreakers in the Baltic Sea.
The vessels were chartered on a contingency basis; Trans Viking's parent company, Transatlantic, is paid a basic flat fee for the vessels to be available, within ten days, without regard to whether they are used. They were used in 2007. The contract expired in 2015.

When Tor Viking arrived alongside in  seas, the man jumped over the icebreaker's railing with the cat tucket in his shirt. The rescue was captured on video by a United States Coast Guard Lockheed C-130 Hercules monitoring the operation.

In December 2015, Tor Viking became the first ship to transit the Northern Sea Route in December without support from nuclear-powered icebreakers at this time of the year. The vessel entered Bering Strait on 28 November and passed around the northern tip of Novaya Zemlya on 10 December.

CCGS Vincent Massey (2022–present) 

In 2016, Chantier Davie Canada began offering Tor Viking and her sister ships as a replacement to the ageing Canadian Coast Guard icebreakers under the moniker "Project Resolute". In addition to the three Swedish icebreaking offshore vessels, the offer also included a fourth slightly bigger and more powerful vessel, the US-flagged . In August 2018, Chantier Davie Canada was awarded a Can$610 million dollar contract for the acquisition and refitting of the three vessels. On 10 August 2018, Viking Supply Ships announced the sale of its three vessels to Canada for a profit of $274 million. Once retrofitted at Davie Shipbuilding, the vessels are expected to remain in service in the Canadian Coast Guard for 15 to 25 years.

Tor Viking will be named CCGS Vincent Massey after Charles Vincent Massey (1887–1967), a Canadian lawyer and diplomat who served as the Governor General of Canada, the 18th since Confederation and the first one born in Canada.

References

Icebreakers of the Canadian Coast Guard
1999 ships